Freytag is a German surname, meaning Friday. Notable people with the surname include:

 Adam Freytag (1608–1650), Polish mathematician and military engineer
 Arny Freytag (born 1950), American photographer
 Georg Wilhelm Friedrich Freytag (1788–1861), German philologist
 Gustav Freytag (1816–1895), German dramatist
 Michael Freytag (born 1958), German politician
Freytag's pyramid
 Bernd von Freytag-Loringhoven (1914–2007), Baltic German general
 Elsa von Freytag-Loringhoven (1874–1927), Dada-artist
 Wessel von Freytag-Loringhoven (1899–1944), Baltic German member of the resistance against Adolf Hitler

See also 
 Freitag (disambiguation)

German-language surnames
Surnames from nicknames